Jill J. Meyers (born February 13, 1950) is an American bridge player from Santa Monica, California. Sometime prior to the 2014 European and World meets (summer and October), she ranked 7th among 73 Women World Grand Masters by world masterpoints (MP) and 1st by placing points that do not decay over time.

Meyers was born in New York City and earned a B.A. from Tulane University. She and her sister Nina moved to Los Angeles in 1972 and started to play duplicate bridge there, where Ed Davis was her first teacher (they still have a partnership). From 1979 she studied law at University of West Los Angeles and she passed the California bar in 1983, after which she played bridge more seriously. She is married to Sid Brownstein and is a self-employed "Music Consultant for Motion Picture, TV and Advertising industries". Before 1988 she worked in music departments within the film industry.

Meyers was inducted ito the ACBL Hall of Fame in 2014.

Bridge accomplishments

Awards and honors

 Herman Trophy (1) 1987
 Mott-Smith Trophy (1) 2001
 ACBL Hall of Fame, 2014

Wins

 North American Bridge Championships (17)
 Blue Ribbon Pairs (1) 1999 
 Nail Life Master Open Pairs (2) 2000, 2005 
 Smith Life Master Women's Pairs (1) 1987 
 Freeman Mixed Board-a-Match (1) 2010 
 Grand National Teams (1) 2001 
 Machlin Women's Swiss Teams (5) 1991, 1993, 2001, 2009, 2011 
 Wagar Women's Knockout Teams (2) 1989, 1997 
 Sternberg Women's Board-a-Match Teams (4) 1991, 1999, 2003, 2011

Runners-up

 North American Bridge Championships
 Silodor Open Pairs (1) 2011 
 North American Pairs (1) 2001 
 Grand National Teams (2) 1999, 2010 
 Machlin Women's Swiss Teams (4) 1987, 1995, 1999, 2003 
 Wagar Women's Knockout Teams (5) 1990, 1993, 2003, 2007, 2012 
 Keohane North American Swiss Teams (1) 1987 
 Sternberg Women's Board-a-Match Teams (5) 2001, 2006, 2009, 2010, 2012

References

External links
 
 
 Women Stars at the World Bridge Federation – with biographies (Meyers, an autobiographical resume)

1950 births
American contract bridge players
American lawyers
Tulane University alumni
Living people